Santiago Tréllez Vivero (born 17 January 1990) is a Colombian professional footballer who plays as a striker for Vitória.

Club career

Early career
Born in Medellín, Tréllez started his career with Envigado before moving to hometown club Independiente Medellín. After impressing during the 2007 South American Under-17 Football Championship and the 2007 FIFA U-17 World Cup, he joined Flamengo, but documentation and financial problems limited his appearances.

In 2008, Tréllez joined Vélez Sarsfield; initially playing for the reserves, he was only a backup option to starter Santiago Silva, and later suffered a knee injury which kept him out for several months. After not making his first team breakthrough, he returned to Colombia and Independiente Medellín, agreeing to a contract with the club in January 2011.

Tréllez made his debut for the club on 6 February 2011, starting in a 2–1 away loss against Itagüí Ditaires. Late in the month he scored his first senior goals, netting a brace in a 3–3 home draw against Millonarios.

Mexico
On 10 July 2012, Tréllez switched teams and countries again, after signing for Liga MX side San Luis. A regular starter, he was sold to Chiapas and immediately loaned to Monarcas Morelia for one year; a backup for the latter in the league, he featured regularly in the Copa MX as his side was crowned champions.

Atlético Nacional and loans

On 14 January 2014, Tréllez was loaned to Atlético Nacional for one-year, with a buyout clause. He was bought outright by the club in the following year, but was loaned to Libertad on 17 January 2015.

Arsenal de Sarandí
Tréllez rescinded with Libertad in July 2015, and subsequently signed a one-year contract with Arsenal de Sarandí. The following 12 January, after only two goals in seven matches, he was loaned to La Equidad for one year.

Deportivo Pasto
On 21 February 2017, Tréllez was announced at Deportivo Pasto. An immediate starter, he scored nine times in 17 matches; highlights included braces against Cortuluá, Independiente Santa Fe and Once Caldas.

Vitória
On 17 July 2017, Tréllez signed an 18-month contract with Série A team Vitória. He made his debut for the club three days later by starting in a 3–1 home loss against Grêmio, and scored his first goals on 3 August in a 3–1 home defeat of Ponte Preta.

On 19 August 2017, Tréllez scored the only goal in an away success over Corinthians, ending the club's 34-match unbeaten run. On 26 November, he scored another brace against Ponte, netting twice in the 3–2 away win but later being booked and subsequently suspended for the last round; the club still managed to avoid relegation nonetheless.

São Paulo
On 27 January 2018, it was announced that São Paulo has reached an agreement with Vitória for the signing of Tréllez. Tricolor Paulista paid R$ 6 million to Rubro-Negro Baiano to sign with them new forward, under a four-year contract

Personal life
Tréllez is the son of the Colombian international footballer John Jairo Tréllez.

Career statistics

Honours

Club
Monarcas Morelia
Copa MX: Apertura 2013

Atlético Nacional
Categoría Primera A: 2014-I

References

External links
 
 
 

1990 births
Living people
Footballers from Medellín
Colombian footballers
Association football forwards
Categoría Primera A players
Independiente Medellín footballers
Atlético Nacional footballers
La Equidad footballers
Deportivo Pasto footballers
Campeonato Brasileiro Série A players
Esporte Clube Vitória players
São Paulo FC players
Sport Club Internacional players
Sport Club do Recife players
Argentine Primera División players
Club Atlético Vélez Sarsfield footballers
Arsenal de Sarandí footballers
Liga MX players
San Luis F.C. players
Chiapas F.C. footballers
Atlético Morelia players
Paraguayan Primera División players
Club Libertad footballers
Colombian expatriate footballers
Colombian expatriate sportspeople in Brazil
Colombian expatriate sportspeople in Argentina
Colombian expatriate sportspeople in Mexico
Colombian expatriate sportspeople in Paraguay
Expatriate footballers in Brazil
Expatriate footballers in Argentina
Expatriate footballers in Mexico
Expatriate footballers in Paraguay